Robert Reid (18 October 1842 – 12 May 1904) was a Scottish-born Australian politician. Born in Leven, Fife, he migrated to Australia, arriving in Hobson's Bay on the Ralph Waller from Liverpool on 7 April 1855, the ship having struck an iceberg near the Island of Desolation. He worked in the retail trade before becoming a businessman.

In 1891, after the death of Nunn, co-owner with Buckley of Buckley & Nunn store, Reid bought the business and sold it on in London in 1892 for £300,000.

In October 1892 Reid was elected to the Victorian Legislative Council for Melbourne Province as a Free Trader, becoming Minister for Defence and Minister for Health. Reid lost his ministerial positions in 1894, but was re-created Minister for Health and also Minister for Public Instruction in 1902. On 21 January 1903, he was appointed to the Australian Senate for Victoria to fill the vacancy caused by the death of Senator Sir Frederick Sargood.

Reid did not contest the 1903 election, and died in 1904 on a visit to London. He is buried in Hampstead Cemetery.

Reid was survived by his wife, four sons and six daughters.  His sons continued the family business.  His daughter Isabelle was a veterinary surgeon.  She established a practice in Balwyn, Victoria close to the family home.

References

Free Trade Party members of the Parliament of Australia
Members of the Australian Senate for Victoria
Members of the Australian Senate
Victoria (Australia) state politicians
Members of the Victorian Legislative Council
Australian people of Scottish descent
1842 births
1904 deaths
19th-century Australian politicians
20th-century Australian politicians
People from Leven, Fife